Chahu-ye Gharbi (also Romanized as Chāhū-ye Gharbī and Chāhū Gharbī; also known as Chāhū Qebleh) is a village in Dulab Rural District, Shahab District, Qeshm County, Hormozgan Province, Iran. At the 2006 census, its population was 527, in 107 families.

References 

Populated places in Qeshm County